Silver Star Reversi is a reversi video game for WiiWare. It was released in Japan on September 2, 2008 and in North America on June 29, 2009.

References

2008 video games
Agetec games
Electronic Arts games
Multiplayer and single-player video games
Video games based on board games
Video games developed in Japan
Wii games
Wii-only games
WiiWare games